Jeanette Johnston is a Scottish curler.

In 2003–2004 she was a President of Ladies Branch of Scottish Curling Association.

She worked as FISU Technical Delegate for curling at the 2019 Winter Universiade.

Teams

References

External links
 

Living people
Scottish female curlers
Scottish curling champions
Year of birth missing (living people)